The Battle of Farah began on 14 May 2018, when Taliban fighters launched an assault on the city of Farah, located in western Afghanistan.

Background
In the months prior to the assault on the city itself, the Taliban had captured much of Afghanistan's Farah province, with fighting intensifying as a result of the group's Al Khandaq spring offensive, named after the Battle of the Trench in which the Islamic prophet Muhammad led a decisive Muslim victory against Arab and Jewish tribes.

Battle
The Taliban began its assault on the city on 14 May 2018, using captured Humvees and Afghan police trucks to attack and overrun checkpoints and government buildings in Farah. Spokesman Zabiullah Mujahid released photos of Taliban fighters in the city's central square, indicating Taliban control of Farah. Reports surfaced of the Taliban freeing hundreds of prisoners from Farah Prison. The Afghan government swiftly responded by sending reinforcements to the city. Afghan Airforce helicopters and American A-10 Warthog attack aircraft launched airstrikes on Taliban positions in Farah.

On 16 May, government security forces backed by U.S. air support reasserted control over Farah after driving the Taliban out of the city center. The security forces then conducted a clearing operation. Abdul Basir Salangi, governor of Farah province, said that the clashes left at least 25 members of the government security forces and five civilians dead, and at least 300 Taliban fighters were also killed.

References

2018 in Afghanistan
Battles involving Afghanistan
Battles of the War in Afghanistan (2001–2021)
Battles in 2018
May 2018 events in Afghanistan